Achantodes is a genus of moths of the family Crambidae. It contains only one species, Achantodes cerusicosta, which is found in Colombia.

References

Glaphyriinae
Monotypic moth genera
Moths of South America
Taxa named by Achille Guenée
Crambidae genera